Av Harikrishna (born 19 August 1996) is an Indian professional footballer who plays as a midfielder for I-League club Chennai City FC.

Career
In the 2018-19 Kerala premier league season Harikrishna played five matches and scored two goals. In 2019 he played in Durand Cup against ATK and scored one goal.

Harikrishna made his first appearance for Chennai City FC on 9 January 2021 in I-League.

Career statistics

References

Living people
1996 births
Indian footballers
Footballers from Thrissur
Association football midfielders
I-League players
I-League 2nd Division players
F.C. Kerala players
Chennai City FC players